Paul Broderick (born 3 January 1970) is a former Australian rules footballer who played in the VFL/AFL between 1988 and 1993 for the Fitzroy Football Club and then from 1994 until 2001 for the Richmond Football Club. He won the Richmond Best and Fairest award in 1996.

References
 Hogan P: The Tigers Of Old, Richmond FC, Melbourne 1996

External links
 
 

Fitzroy Football Club players
Richmond Football Club players
Jack Dyer Medal winners
Australian rules footballers from Victoria (Australia)
Camperdown Football Club players
Living people
1970 births